Kwacha may refer to:

 Malawian kwacha, the currency of Malawi since 1971
 Zambian kwacha, the currency of Zambia since 1968
"Kwacha," a member of the UNITA political party in Angola
Kwacha (constituency), a constituency of the National Assembly of Zambia